Captain Cook Cruises is an Australian cruise operator. As of January 2018, the company operated 21 vessels on Sydney Harbour, providing a range of Government contracted and non-contracted Ferry services, Sightseeing,  Dining and Charter Cruises.

History

Captain Cook Cruises commenced operating on 26 January 1970 on Port Jackson, Sydney with the Captain Cook, a modified 1943 Fairmile B motor launch. The business was founded by Trevor Haworth taking its name from James Cook who led the first European contact with the East Coast of Australia in 1770.

Initially operating charters, on 1 May 1970 regular cruises began operating from Circular Quay to Middle Harbour. In November 1971 a second cruise commenced via the Lane Cove and Parramatta Rivers as far as the Gladesville Bridge.

In August 1975, the custom-built Captain Cook II built by Carrington Slipways, Tomago was commissioned. In August 1978, the Lady Geradline was built by Millkraft Shipyards, Brisbane. This was followed by City of Sydney built by Sims Engineering, Port Chalmers in 1981. In 1978 the original Northbridge marina was sold with a new facility purchased in Neutral Bay.In May 1984, the John Cadman Cruising Restaurant business was purchased. In 1987, Captain Cook Cruises began operating cruises on the Hawkesbury River and Pittwater with the Lady Hawkesbury. In November 1987, the Hegarty Ferries business was purchased from Stannard Bros, primarily to give Captain Cook Cruises exclusive access to wharf 6 at Circular Quay. It operated services to Jeffrey Street, Milsons Point and McMahons Point. In May 1988, the business of Murray River Developments was purchased with the Murray River Queen and Murray Princess on the Murray River and the Brisbane Explorer on the Brisbane River.

In 1991, operations began on the Great Barrier Reef in a joint venture with Qantas. The  was ordered, however problems during its construction resulted in the Lady Hawkesbury being transferred from the Hawkesbury River to the Great Barrier Reef  as the Reef Escape in July 1992. In turn the Brisbane Explorer was transferred to the Hawkesbury as the Hawkesbury Explorer II. The Reef Endeavour eventually entered service in 1995.

In 1992, the company began operations in Fiji, purchasing Tivua Island, located 18km off the coast of Port Denarau. Sailing Day Cruises were commenced to the island. Reef Escape was relocated to Fiji from the Great Barrier Reef in 1995 and began accommodated cruises through the Yasawa and Mamanuca Islands . 
 
On 7 January 2003, the former Hegarty routes ceased. In November 2005 Matilda Cruises was acquired from Amalgamated Holdings Limited (now Event Hospitality and Entertainment), with 11 vessels. In 2011, Captain Cook Cruises was purchased by the SeaLink Travel Group.

Sydney

Network

Captain Cook Cruises operate ferry services connecting Sydney Harbour, Darling Harbour, Barangaroo, Circular Quay, Watsons Bay, Manly, the Lane Cove River and White Bay.

The Shark Island and Zoo Express are part of the Hop On Hop Off (HOHO) services which also call at Watsons Bay and Manly. These services will resume during the school holidays on 19 December 2020 after the COVID-19 Pandemic.

Resumption dates for the City Loop (Darling Harbour/Barnagaroo), Luna Park, and Fort Denison services are not yet known. 

City Loop
 Sydney Aquarium
 Darling Harbour	
 Luna Park	
 Circular Quay West	

Shark Island
Circular Quay West
 Shark Island

Zoo Express
Circular Quay West
 Taronga Zoo

White Bay Only operates on days that there are cruise liners at White Bay. So will not resume until the cruise terminal reopens.
Darling Harbour
White Bay

Watsons Bay
A commuter service between Watsons Bay and Circular Quay commenced on 23 March 2015.

Lane Cove River
Circular Quay West
Jeffrey Street
 Kirribilli
 Birchgrove
 Greenwich Point
Bay Street, Greenwich
 Northwood
 Longueville
Alexandra Street, Hunters Hill
 St Ignatius' College, Riverview

Vessels

References

External links

Ferry companies of Australia
1970 establishments in Australia